Goetre Fawr is a community and electoral ward in Monmouthshire, Wales, a few miles south of the town of Abergavenny.

According to the 2011 UK Census the population of the community and ward was 2,393.

Community
The community includes the villages or settlements of Goytre, Penperlleni, Little Mill, Mamhilad, Nant-y-derry and Pencroesoped. The A4042 road from Abergavenny to Cwmbran runs through the middle of the community, as does the Monmouthshire and Brecon Canal and the mainline railway. Part of the eastern border is formed by the River Usk.

Governance
Goetre Fawr elects or co-opts up to twelve community councillors to Goetre Fawr Community Council. The Goetre Fawr electoral ward elects one county councillor to Monmouthshire County Council.

References

Communities in Monmouthshire
Monmouthshire electoral wards